Ryan Donald Barnes (born January 30, 1980) is a Canadian former professional ice hockey left winger who played two games in the National Hockey League with the Detroit Red Wings during the 2003–04 season. The rest of his career, which lasted from 2000 to 2007, was spent in various minor leagues.

Barnes was drafted in the second round, fifty-fifth overall in the 1998 NHL Entry Draft by the Detroit Red Wings. Barnes played his junior career for three teams in the OHL; the Sudbury Wolves, the Toronto St. Michael's Majors and finally the Barrie Colts. On October 3, 1999, he was suspended from the OHL for 25 games for a stick-swinging incident in a game against Oshawa Generals. At the end of that season, he played with the Barrie Colts in the Memorial Cup Championship final.

He has played two career games in the National Hockey League, as a member of the Detroit Red Wings.

After retiring as a player Barnes worked as a coach, starting in the 2007–08 season with the Port Colborne Sailors of the Greater Ontario Junior Hockey League. Barnes was hired to work as an assistant coach with the Peterborough Petes for the 2008–09 season.

Career statistics

Regular season and playoffs

External links
 
 AHL Ryan Barnes Profile

1980 births
Living people
Barrie Colts players
Canadian ice hockey left wingers
Cincinnati Mighty Ducks players
Danbury Trashers players
Detroit Red Wings draft picks
Detroit Red Wings players
Grand Rapids Griffins players
Hamilton Bulldogs (AHL) players
Ice hockey people from Ontario
Kalamazoo Wings (UHL) players
Muskegon Fury players
Sportspeople from Haldimand County
Sudbury Wolves players
Toledo Storm players
Toronto St. Michael's Majors players